The Thrill of Brazil, also known as Dancing Down to Rio, is a 1946 American  musical film directed by S. Sylvan Simon for Columbia Pictures and starring Evelyn Keyes, Keenan Wynn, and Ann Miller.

Plot

Vicki Dean is the soon to be divorced wife of theatrical manager Steve Farraugh. While mounting a big musical spectacular in Brazil, Farraugh simultaneously campaigns to win back his wife. The couple encounters romantic interference from tap-dancer Linda Lorens.

Cast

References

External links
 
 
 
 

1946 films
American musical films
1946 musical films
Films directed by S. Sylvan Simon
Columbia Pictures films
American black-and-white films
1940s English-language films
1940s American films